All Souls Church is a historic Episcopal church located at Tannersville in Greene County, New York. It was built in 1894 as a small stone chapel in the Gothic Revival style.  It was subsequently enlarged in the 1910s with the enlargement of the chancel and addition of transepts.  It features a large square bell tower at the southwest corner that also serves as the principal entrance.

It was added to the National Register of Historic Places in 1993.

See also
National Register of Historic Places listings in Greene County, New York

References

External links
 Photograph of All Souls Church - Onteora Park, Tannersville NY

Episcopal church buildings in New York (state)
Churches on the National Register of Historic Places in New York (state)
Gothic Revival church buildings in New York (state)
Churches completed in 1894
19th-century Episcopal church buildings
Churches in Greene County, New York
National Register of Historic Places in Greene County, New York